The Lithuanian Union of Architects is an independent organization with 1079 members (2008) headquartered in Vilnius. It was founded in 1925 in Kaunas. It is a member of the International Union of Architects since 1993. Its board of directors has 6 members and a president who are elected every three years during the general assembly.

Lidl scandal
In 2016, Lidl bought an abandoned building in the outskirts of Vilnius with intentions to build local headquarters. Soon after the purchase, Lithuanian architectural union together with Lithuania's ministry of culture declared the building ruin to be a protected Lithuanian architectural treasure freezing Lidl's plans in the process. There have been speculations and allegations that such actions were a covert attempt to extort bribes. After a public dispute, where Lidl placed formal complaints to various branches of Lithuanian government, including to Lithuania's president, and after several rounds of legal battles Lithuanian architectural union backed off.

References

External links 
 LAS homepage

Architecture-related professional associations
Organizations based in Vilnius
Non-profit organizations based in Lithuania
1925 establishments in Lithuania
Organizations established in 1925